GIDA Sahjanwan is industrial area of Gorakhpur in the state of Uttar Pradesh. It is fast developing an industrial area abbreviated as GIDA with many factories, including IGL, Parle and ARP, as well as power looms, plywood and the only jute mill in Uttar Pradesh.

Demographics
According to the Census of India in 2001, Sahjanwa had a population of 25,091. Males constitute 53% of the population and females 47%. Sahjanwan has an average literacy rate of 57%, lower than India's national average of 59.5%.  Male literacy is 70%, and female literacy is 43%. In Sahjanwa 17% of the population is 6 or younger.  Sahjanwa is in the eastern part of Uttar Pradesh. Hindi is the customary language.

Economy

Manufacturing
Located in the Industrial park (GIDA) of the Gorakhpur are:

Transport
Sahjanwan has a passenger railway station with trains that go to main railway station of Gorakhpur i.e., Gorakhpur Junction and it also has trains which go to Lucknow. In addition, buses lead to and stop at Gida Gorakhpur

References

Gorakhpur district information

Cities and towns in Gorakhpur district